Ziaabad (also Romanized as Ẕīā’ābād; also known as Ẕīādābād and Ẕīyā’ābād) is a village in Posht Rud Rural District, in the Central District of Narmashir County, Kerman Province, Iran. At the 2006 census, its population was 625, in 165 families.

References 

Populated places in Narmashir County